Saptarshi Banerjee, is a doctor and an Indian politician member of All India Trinamool Congress.  He is an MLA, elected from the  Basirhat Dakshin constituency in the 2021 West Bengal Legislative Assembly election.  He gathered 1,15,873 votes in the election.

Education
He passed MBBS from NRS Medical College in 2005, Calcutta University and M.S. Ophthalmology from Vivekanand Institute of Medical College, WB University of Health Science in 2010.  He was associated with medical teaching Medical College Kolkata.

References 

Trinamool Congress politicians from West Bengal
Living people
People from North 24 Parganas district
West Bengal MLAs 2021–2026
Year of birth missing (living people)